Parmacella is a genus of air-breathing land slugs, terrestrial gastropod mollusks in the family Parmacellidae.

Slugs within this genus create and use love darts.

Species
Species within the genus Parmacella include:
 Cryptella canariensis Webb & Berthelot, 1833 / Parmacella canariensis (Webb & Berthelot, 1833)
 Parmacella deshayesi Moquin-Tandon, 1848
 Parmacella festae Gambetta, 1925
 Parmacella gervaisii Moquin-Tandon, 1850 - extinct
 Parmacella ibera Eichwald, 1841
 Parmacella olivieri Cuvier, 1804 - type species
 Parmacella tenerifensis Alonso, Ibanez & Diaz, 1985
 Parmacella valenciennii Webb & Van Beneden, 1836

References 

Parmacellidae
Taxa named by Georges Cuvier
Taxonomy articles created by Polbot